The Treaties of Erzurum were two treaties of 1823 and 1847 that settled boundary disputes between the Ottoman Empire and Persia.

First Treaty 

Although the Treaty of Zuhab in 1639 had established the boundary between Ottoman Empire and Persia, the border in the mountainous Zuhab region remained a site of intermittent conflict in the subsequent two centuries. Tensions between the two empires had been rising due to the Ottoman Empire's harboring of rebellious tribesmen from Persian Azerbaijan. Although secretly, the Russian Empire was attempting to put pressure on the Ottoman Empire, which was at war with the Greeks, who were receiving arms from Russia. Crown Prince Abbas Mirza of Persia, at the instigation of the Russian Empire, invaded Kurdistan and the areas surrounding Persian Azerbaijan, starting the Ottoman–Persian War.

After the 1821 Battle of Erzurum, resulting in a Persian victory, both empires signed the first Treaty of Erzurum in July 1823, which confirmed the 1639 border. The treaty also contained various economic and diplomatic clauses. Included in the treaty was the guaranteed access for Persian pilgrims to visit holy sites within the Ottoman Empire. This had previously been promised by the 1746 Treaty of Kerden, but those rights had degraded over time. The treaty regulated the taxes concerning the pilgrims and for the nomadic tribes pasturing their livestock in the borderlands. The treaty instituted a flat 4% tax on Persian merchants in the Ottoman Empire, which was collected at the first entry point of the merchant, likely Baghdad or Erzurum, or at Istanbul. The treaty also allowed for the free trade of glass pipes from Persia to Istanbul.

The treaty represented a subtle shift in the way the Ottomans viewed Persia. The Ottomans recognized Persia as a separate nation whose subjects could call upon Persia for redress if their individual rights had been violated - a privilege formerly only offered to European nations. Persia was the first and only Muslim state to achieve this. It was also agreed upon, that the every three years, Persia, as well as the Ottomans would send an envoy to the other country, therefore establishing permanent diplomatic relations with each other.

Second Treaty 

A series of border incidents in the 1830s again brought Persia and the Ottoman Empire to the brink of war. Britain and Russia offered to mediate, and a second Treaty of Erzurum was signed on 31 May 1847.

This treaty divided the disputed region between the two parties and provided for a boundary commission, composed of Ottoman, Persian, Russian, and British representatives, to delimit the entire border. The boundary commission's work encountered several political setbacks but finally completed its task when the two countries agreed to the Constantinople Protocol of November 4, 1913. The treaty represents the adoption of a modern European view of territorial sovereignty by the Ottoman Empire and Persia.

The treaty also extended economic ties and the protection of Persian merchants. Persian consuls were established throughout the empire, charged with protecting Persians in criminal or commercial legal cases.

References

Bibliography 
Lambton, Ann K. S. "The Qajar Dynasty." In Qājār Persia: Eleven Studies, edited by Ann K. S. Lambton. Austin: University of Texas Press, 1987.

Erzurum
1847 treaties
1823 treaties
Erzurum
History of Erzurum
1823 in the Ottoman Empire
1847 in the Ottoman Empire
19th century in Iran
Ottoman–Persian Wars
July 1823 events
May 1847 events
Boundary treaties